Quesnelia marmorata is a species of flowering plant in the family Bromeliaceae, endemic to the Atlantic Forest ecoregion of southeastern Brazil. It was first described by Charles Antoine Lemaire in 1855 as Billbergia marmorata.

See also

References 

marmorata
Endemic flora of Brazil
Flora of the Atlantic Forest
Flora of Espírito Santo
Flora of Rio de Janeiro (state)
Flora of São Paulo (state)
Garden plants of South America